The men's 4 x 100 metres relay at the 1966 European Athletics Championships was held in Budapest, Hungary, at Népstadion on 3 and 4 September 1966.

Medalists

Results

Final
4 September

Heats
3 September

Heat 1

Heat 2

Participation
According to an unofficial count, 48 athletes from 12 countries participated in the event.

 (4)
 (4)
 (4)
 (4)
 (4)
 (4)
 (4)
 (4)
 (4)
 (4)
 (4)
 (4)

References

4 x 100 metres relay
Relays at the European Athletics Championships